KVOM-FM (102.7 MHz) is a radio station airing a country music format licensed to Morrilton, Arkansas.  The station is owned by Bobby Caldwell's East Arkansas Broadcasters, through licensee EAB of Morrilton, LLC.

KVOM-FM broadcasts country music and locally produced programs such as "NewsWatch" and "Trading Time."  NewsWatch airs at 7:30 am and 4:45 pm weekdays and 7:30 am and noon on Saturdays.  Trading Time airs at 8:30 am Monday through Saturday.  The station also broadcasts Morrilton High School football and basketball games and Sacred Heart High School basketball games, as well as Arkansas Razorback football and basketball games and Oaklawn horse racing results.

References

External links
KVOM-FM's official website

Country radio stations in the United States
VOM-FM
Morrilton, Arkansas
1980 establishments in Arkansas
Radio stations established in 1980